No.2 Squadron (Winged Arrows) is a unit dedicated to CAS in the Indian Air Force. No. 2 Sqn falls under the Eastern Air Command.

History

Assignments
World War II
Indo-Pakistani War of 1965
Indo-Pakistani War of 1971

Aircraft

References

002
1941 establishments in India